James Mortimer (1842 – 14 September 1915) was a dog judge and bench show superintendent.

Biography
He was born in Crediton in Devon, England.

Legacy
James Mortimer Memorial Trophy

References

1842 births
1915 deaths
Westminster Kennel Club Dog Show
People from Crediton
Dog judges